Victor Griffuelhes (14 March 1874, Nérac – 30 June 1922, Saclas) was a French socialist and leader of the General Confederation of Labour (CGT) in France. He was drawn to anarcho-syndicalism and advocated the establishment of socialism through independent trade union action.

Dreyfus affair 
According to Zeev Sternhell, Griffuelhes, like Emile Pouget, has been indifferent to the Dreyfus Affair, seeing it as a bourgeois mystification to distract the people from true issues.

Publications
 « Romantisme révolutionnaire », L'Action directe, n°15, 23 April 1908
 L'Action syndicaliste, Bibliothèque du mouvement socialiste, IV, Librairie des sciences politiques et sociales, Paris, Marcel Rivière, 1908, Complete text
 « Le syndicalisme révolutionnaire », La Publication sociale, coll. Bibliothèque d'études syndicalistes, 1909
 « De 1899 à 1909 : la leçon du passé », La Vie ouvrière, n°1, 5 October 1909
 À propos d'un livre (Comment nous ferons la Révolution, par Pataud et Pouget), La Vie ouvrière, n°5, 5 December 1909 Complete text
 With Louis Mercier-Vega, Anarcho-syndicalisme et syndicalisme révolutionnaire, Paris, 1978

Bibliography 
 Delpont Hubert, Victor Griffuellhes, un Lot-et-Garonnais fondateur de la CGT, Agen, 1983, 40 p.
 Vandervort Bruce : Victor Griffuelhes and French Syndicalism 1895-1922, Baton Rouge, 1996, 278 p.
 Flax, Victor Griffuelhes, n°56, 1909, complete text.

References

External links 

 Eduiard Dolléans, Histoire du mouvement ouvrier, volume 2, page 85
 Notice sur le site de l'IHS CGT
 Les textes de Griffuelhes sur Pelloutier.net

1874 births
1922 deaths
Anarcho-syndicalists
People from Nérac
Members of the General Confederation of Labour (France)
French socialists
French syndicalists